Ernest Gasson (11 November 1907 – 7 September 1942) was a New Zealand cricketer. He played in three first-class matches for Canterbury in 1937/38. He was killed in action during World War II.

See also
 List of Canterbury representative cricketers

References

External links

1907 births
1942 deaths
Military personnel from Christchurch
New Zealand cricketers
Canterbury cricketers
Cricketers from Christchurch
New Zealand military personnel killed in World War II